qBittorrent is a cross-platform free and open-source BitTorrent client written in native C++. It relies on Boost, Qt 6 toolkit and the libtorrent-rasterbar library (for the torrent back-end), with an optional search engine written in Python.

History 

qBittorrent was originally developed in March 2006 by Christophe Dumez, from the University of Technology of Belfort-Montbéliard (UTBM).

It is currently developed by contributors worldwide and is funded through donations, led by Sledgehammer999 from Greece, who became project maintainer in June 2013.

Along with the 4.0.0 release a new logo for the project was unveiled.

In February 2023, a security vulnerability affecting versions 4.5.0 and 4.5.1 was discovered in the Web UI running on Windows systems. This vulnerability enabled unauthenticated access to all files on the host computer via a path traversal bug. This issue has been patched in version 4.5.2, which was released to the public on February 23, 2023.

Features 

Some of the features present in qBittorrent include:
 Bandwidth scheduler
 Bind all traffic to a specific interface
 Control over torrents, trackers and peers (torrents queueing and prioritizing and torrent content selection and prioritizing)
 DHT, PEX, encrypted connections, LPD, UPnP, NAT-PMP port forwarding support, µTP, magnet links, private torrents
 IP filtering: file types eMule dat or PeerGuardian
 IPv6 support
 Integrated RSS feed reader (with advanced download filters) and downloader
 Integrated torrent search engine (simultaneous search in many torrent search sites and category-specific search requests, such as books, music and software)
 Remote control through a secure web user interface
 Sequential downloading (download in order). Enables "streaming" media files
 Super-seeding option
 Torrent creation tool
 Torrent queuing, filtering and prioritizing
 Unicode support, available in ≈70 languages

Versions 
qBittorrent is cross-platform, available on many operating systems, including: FreeBSD, Linux, macOS, OS/2 (including ArcaOS and eComStation), Windows.

, SourceForge statistics indicate that the most popular qBittorrent version of all supported platforms, 81% of downloads were for Windows computers.

, FossHub statistics indicate qBittorrent as the second most downloaded software with over 75 million downloads.

Packages for different Linux distributions are available, though most are provided through official channels via various distributions.

qBittorrent Enhanced is a fork of qBittorrent intended for blocking leeching clients such as Xunlei. It is hosted on GitHub.

Reception 
In 2012, Ghacks suggested qBittorrent as a great alternative to μTorrent, for those put off by its controversial adware and bundleware changes.

See also 

 Comparison of BitTorrent clients
 List of free and open-source software packages
 Usage share of BitTorrent clients

References

External links 

 
 
 qBittorrent on FossHub

2006 software
BitTorrent clients for Linux
File sharing software that uses Qt
Free BitTorrent clients
Free file sharing software
Free software programmed in C++
MacOS file sharing software
Portable software
Windows file sharing software
Windows-only freeware